Sugiyama (written: 杉山, lit. "Japanese cedar, mountain") is a Japanese surname. Notable people with the surname include:

Sport and martial arts
Ai Sugiyama, Japanese professional tennis player
, Japanese footballer
Kento Sugiyama,  Japanese baseball player
Kota Sugiyama, Japanese football player
Marcos Sugiyama, Brazilian Japanese volleyball player
, Japanese mixed martial artist
Ryuichi Sugiyama, Japanese football player
Sachiko Sugiyama, Japanese volleyball player
, Shotokan karate instructor
, Japanese basketball player
, Japanese footballer
, Japanese sport wrestler

Science 

Kozo Sugiyama, a researcher in graph layout, author of Sugiyama algorithm.

Arts and entertainment
Heiichi Sugiyama, Japanese poet and film critic
Kazuko Sugiyama, Japanese voice actress
Kira Sugiyama, Japanese photographer
Kiyotaka Sugiyama, Japanese singer-songwriter
Koichi Sugiyama, Japanese composer and council member of JASRAC
Noriaki Sugiyama, Japanese voice actor
Riho Sugiyama, Japanese voice actress
Yasushi Sugiyama, Japanese watercolor painter

Military history
Sugiyama Gengo, another name for Japanese samurai Ishida Shigenari
Hajime Sugiyama, Japanese World War II field marshal

Other
Kozo Sugiyama, Japanese computer scientist and graph drawing researcher
Shinsuke J. Sugiyama, Japanese diplomat

See also
 29624 Sugiyama, a main-belt asteroid
 Sugiyama Jogakuen University, a private women's college in Nagoya, Japan

Japanese-language surnames